Kema (Kecamatan Kema) is a district in North Minahasa Regency, North Sulawesi Province, Indonesia.

Geography of Sulawesi